Buchan Gulf is an isolated, elongated Arctic fjord on Baffin Island's northeastern coast in the Qikiqtaaluk Region of Nunavut, Canada.

Geography

Fauna
It is a Canadian Important Bird Area (#NU069), an International Biological Program site (Region 9, #7-11), and a Key Migratory Bird Terrestrial Habitat site. There is a sizeable population of northern fulmars. Megafauna which can be seen in the water include polar bears, walruses, and narwhals.

References

Bodies of water of Baffin Island
Gulfs of Qikiqtaaluk Region
Important Bird Areas of Qikiqtaaluk Region
Important Bird Areas of Arctic islands
Seabird colonies